Yrsa Carola Stenius  (7 January 1945 – 18 May 2018) was a Finnish born Swedish journalist and newspaper editor.

She was born in Helsinki to architect Olof Stenius and actress Dorle von Wendt. She studied literature and philology at the University of Helsinki. She was chief editor of the newspaper Arbetarbladet from 1972 to 1978. From 1979 she was cultural editor for the newspaper Aftonbladet and was appointed chief editor for the newspaper from 1982 to 1987. She has written biographies of Jussi Björling and Albert Speer, and other books include Makten och kvinnligheten (1993) and Lögnens olidliga lättnad (2005).

She died on 18 May 2018, 73 years old.

References

Further reading
 

1945 births
2018 deaths
Journalists from Helsinki
University of Helsinki alumni
Finnish writers in Swedish
Swedish newspaper editors
Swedish people of Finnish descent